Vilhelmina "Vilma" Bardauskienė (born 15 June 1953) is a former long jumper from Lithuania, who represented the Soviet Union in the late 1970s and early 1980s. She twice set the women's world record in the long jump, and won the European title in 1978 (Prague). She was born in Pakruojis.

Bardauskienė was the first female athlete to break the 7m barrier in long jump (7.07m). Eleven days later she broke her own record by two centimetres (7.09m) at the European Championships in Prague.

Biography
Since the age of 14, she competed in long jumping. She was trained by Y.Y. Goodvich and Igor Ter-Ovanesyan.

Because of the injury and the birth of the son (1975), she had a break in 1974-1976.

In 1987, the IAAF named Bardauskienė among the 10 best jumpers of the world in history (the fifth place).

References
Profile

1953 births
Living people
Soviet female long jumpers
Lithuanian female long jumpers
World record setters in athletics (track and field)
People from Pakruojis
European Athletics Championships medalists